Married... with Children is an American television sitcom created by Michael G. Moye and Ron Leavitt for Fox. Originally broadcast from April 5, 1987, to June 9, 1997, it is the longest-lasting live-action sitcom that aired on Fox. Married... with Children was the first series to be broadcast in the primetime slot of the then-new fourth network, Fox. In addition to the show's original run, one episode that was not aired after filming on January 6, 1989, was aired on FX on June 18, 2002, five years after the series' conclusion.

The show follows the Chicago lives of Al Bundy, a once-glorious high school football player turned hard-luck women's shoe salesman; his lazy wife, Peggy; their pretty and dim-witted daughter, Kelly; and their smart-aleck son, Bud. The show also prominently features their neighbors, the stuffy Steve and Marcy Rhoades, both of whom Al finds somewhat annoying, although the feeling is mutual from the Rhoades; and later, Marcy's second husband Jefferson D'Arcy, a white-collar criminal who becomes her "trophy husband" and Al's sidekick.

The series is one of the longest running sitcoms in television history, comprising eleven seasons with 259 episodes during its run. Its theme song is "Love and Marriage" by Sammy Cahn and Jimmy Van Heusen, performed by Frank Sinatra from the 1955 television production Our Town.

The first two seasons of the series were videotaped at ABC Television Center in Hollywood. Seasons three to eight were taped at Sunset Gower Studios in Hollywood; the final three seasons were taped at Sony Pictures Studios in Culver City. The series was produced by Embassy Communications during its first season and half of its second season and the remaining seasons by ELP Communications under the studio Columbia Pictures Television.

In 2008, the show made the top 100 on Entertainment Weekly "New TV Classics" list, placing number 94.

In May 2022, it was announced that an animated revival of the series was currently in the works.

Cast and characters 

 Al Bundy (Ed O'Neill) – A misanthrope, afflicted by the so-called "Bundy curse" that consigns him to an unrewarding career selling women's shoes and a life with a family that mocks and disrespects him, who still enjoys the simple things in life. He constantly attempts to relive his high-school football days, when he was an "All State Fullback". His most noted achievement was having scored four touchdowns in a single game for Polk High. His favorite things in life are the local nudie bar, his collection of BigUns magazine, his Dodge car with almost  on the odometer, and a television show called Psycho Dad. Despite his family's antipathy for him, and his for them, Al is always ready to defend his family and the Bundy honor.
 Peggy Bundy (née Wanker) (Katey Sagal) – Al's wife who is always pestering him about money and refuses to do any housework or get a job. Peggy is a lazy redhead who spends most of her time watching talk shows such as Oprah or stealing Al's limited funds to go shopping; she frequently mocks Al about his unglamourous job, his meager earnings, his hygiene, and his poor sexual abilities. Her careless spending on things like clothes and male strip clubs has run Al into debt on numerous occasions. A recurring joke in the series is Al's and Peggy's  regrets of having married each other, although on occasion they will show affection towards one another. Peggy's best friend is Marcy, with whom Peggy occasionally leads into trouble. Peggy's side of the family is a backwoods clan of hillbillies whom she often forces the other Bundys to endure, especially her morbidly obese mother, whom Al finds intolerable.
 Kelly Bundy (Christina Applegate) – the Bundys' firstborn; a dumb blonde who is often derided as promiscuous and dates guys who irritate Al to the point of where he wants to physically assault them. Her stupidity manifests in many ways, from forgetting ideas on the spot to mispronouncing or misspelling simple words. She and her brother Bud generally get along, but enjoy belittling one another.
 Budrick "Bud" Franklin Bundy (David Faustino) – the younger Bundy offspring, and sometimes the more level-headed family member, although his preoccupation with sex sometimes leads to inevitable failures with women. He and older sister Kelly constantly taunt each other, but when Kelly is in a legitimate bind he will support her, much like Kelly does for him under similar circumstances.
 Marcy Rhoades, later Marcy D'Arcy (Amanda Bearse) – the Bundys' next-door neighbor, Al's nemesis and Peggy's best friend; an educated banker, but also a feminist and environmentalist who often protests Al's schemes with his NO MA'AM (National Organization of Men Against Amazonian Masterhood) group. Marcy is the founder and leader of an anti-man support group called "FANG" (Feminists Against Neanderthal Guys). Marcy and Al constantly bicker and do not get along. For the first few seasons of the show, Marcy is married to Steve Rhoades. After Marcy and Steve divorce and he leaves during the fourth season, Marcy meets and marries Jefferson D'Arcy, giving her the name Marcy D'Arcy.
 Steven "Steve" Bartholomew Rhoades (David Garrison) is Marcy's first husband, a stuffy banker who finds himself frequently entangled in Al's schemes. Steve's most prized possession is his Mercedes Benz, which he does not even let Marcy drive. Although very much in love at the beginning of the series, Steve and Marcy grow apart and he leaves her during the fourth season to become a forest ranger at Yosemite National Park. He later comes back in "The Egg and I" episode to try and reclaim his old life with Marcy, but finds trouble with Jefferson, Marcy's second husband. Steve later has another job as the dean of Bud's college, after blackmailing the previous one he worked under as a chauffeur.
 Jefferson Milhouse D'Arcy (Ted McGinley), a pretty-boy scammer to whom Marcy wakes up one morning and discovers she has married. Unlike Steve, Jefferson is more of a free spirit, likes to have fun, is constantly unemployed, has no money of his own, and uses Marcy for financial purposes. Marcy is aware of this, but whenever Jefferson gets into trouble with her, he distracts her by working his charm and resorting to sexual bartering. In several episodes, Jefferson is implied, but never confirmed, to have had a past life as a former spy/CIA operative.

Pilot episode 
In the show's pilot episode, actors Tina Caspary and Hunter Carson played the roles of Kelly and Bud Bundy, respectively. Before the series aired publicly the roles for the two Bundy children were re-cast. Ed O'Neill and the show's producers worried about a lack of chemistry with the parents and the original actors cast as the children. A re-casting was done and all of the scenes in the pilot with Carson and Caspary were re-shot with David Faustino and Christina Applegate playing Bud and Kelly Bundy.

Recurring characters

Reception

Ratings

Despite the show's enduring popularity and fanbase, Married... with Children was never a huge ratings success. Part of the reason was that Fox, a startup network, did not have the affiliate base of the Big Three television networks, thus preventing the series from reaching the entire country. In an interview for a special commemorating the series' 20-year anniversary in 2007, Katey Sagal stated that part of the problem the series faced was that many areas of the country were able to get Fox only through low-quality UHF channels well into the early 1990s, while some areas of the country did not receive the new network at all, a problem not largely rectified until the launch of Foxnet in June 1991 and later the network's acquisition of National Football League rights which led to several stations across the United States changing affiliations. For instance, Ed O'Neill's hometown of Youngstown, Ohio didn't have its own Fox affiliate until CBS affiliate WKBN-TV signed on WFXI-CA/WYFX-LP in 1998, one year after the show went off the air (the area was served by WPGH-TV in Pittsburgh and Cleveland's Fox affiliates—initially WOIO, then WJW—as default affiliates on cable), so many of O'Neill's friends and family mistakenly thought he was famous for beer commercials during this time.

Another problem lay in the fact that many of the newly developed series on Fox were unsuccessful, which kept the network from building a popular lineup to draw in a larger audience. In its original airing debut, Married... with Children was part of a Sunday lineup that competed with the popular Murder, She Wrote and Sunday-night movie on CBS. Fellow freshman series included Duet, cancelled in 1989, along with It's Garry Shandling's Show and The Tracey Ullman Show, both of which were canceled in 1990. The success of The Simpsons, which debuted on The Tracey Ullman Show in 1987, helped draw some viewers over to Fox, allowing Married... with Children to sneak into the Nielsen Top 50 from Season 4 through Season 8, peaking at No. 37 in Season 6. Although these ratings were somewhat small in comparison with the other three networks, they were good enough for Fox to keep renewing the show.

While the series didn't end on a cliffhanger, it was expected to be renewed for a 12th season (which would have been the final season) and thus didn't have a proper series finale when Fox decided to cancel it in 1997. With Fox announcing the cancellation publicly before informing the cast and crew, most if not all of them found out about the series cancellation from fans and low-level employees instead of from the network itself. Katey Sagal stated that she constantly felt that the series was neglected by Fox despite helping bring the fledgling network on the map (Married with Children having been on even before The Simpsons); for his part, Ed O'Neill attributed possible neglect of the series by Fox to constant turnover of some of the top positions at the network. In a 2013 interview, O'Neill stated that he felt TV stations who owned syndication rights to the series put pressure on Fox and Sony Pictures Television to end the series since the series had nearly three times the episodes needed for syndication and the production of more episodes would have resulted in higher rights fees.

Controversy 
The series is considered the first raunchy sitcom to run on regular network television and in 1989, Terry Rakolta from Bloomfield Hills, Michigan attempted to lead a boycott of the show after viewing the episode "Her Cups Runneth Over". Offended by the images of an old man wearing a woman's garter and stockings, the scene where Steve touches the pasties of a mannequin dressed in S&M gear, a homosexual man wearing a tiara on his head (and Al's line "...and they wonder why we call them 'queens), and a half-nude woman who takes off her bra in front of Al (and is shown with her arms covering her bare chest in the next shot), Rakolta began a letter-writing campaign to advertisers, demanding they boycott the show.

After advertisers began dropping their support for the show, and while Rakolta made several appearances on television talk shows demanding the show's cancellation, Fox executives refused to air the episode titled "I'll See You in Court" (in which the Bundys attempt to improve their love life by having marital relations in a different setting). This episode became known as the "Lost Episode" and was aired on FX on June 18, 2002, with some parts cut. The episode was packaged with the rest of the third season in the January 2005 DVD release (and in the first volume of the Married ... With Children Most Outrageous Episodes DVD set) with the parts cut from syndication restored.

Viewers' curiosity over the boycott and over the show itself led to a drastic ratings boost in an example of the Streisand Effect, which Rakolta has since acknowledged. Rakolta has been alluded to twice on the show: "Rock and Roll Girl", in which a newscaster mentions the city Bloomfield Hills, and "No Pot to Pease In", in which a television show is made about the Bundy family and then cancelled because, as Marcy stated, "some woman in Michigan didn't like it."

The conservative Parents Television Council named Married... with Children the worst show of both the 1995–96 and 1996–97 television seasons in its first two years in operation. Right-wing Senator Jesse Helms called the show "trash". Amanda Bearse told News Corp Australia in 2018 that she did not believe the show would work in the present day given its content amid a more politically correct climate. 

Despite the series’ controversial content and being largely aimed at an adult audience, it did receive recognition as one of the few series at the time that gave women prominent roles behind the scenes. Producers decided to rewrite the sixth season storyline of Peggy's pregnancy, which coincided with Sagal's actual pregnancy, as a dream that Al had. This was done to prevent Sagal from suffering further trauma by having her character Peggy interact with a new baby, when Sagal herself had a baby that was stillborn in real life. Bearse showed she was a talented director as well as an actress by moving to the director's chair and directing her co-stars for over 30 episodes of the series between 1991 and 1997. Bearse also became one of the first mainstream actresses to publicly come out as lesbian, which she did during the series run and received positive recognition for doing so.

On April 22, 2012, Fox reaired the series premiere in commemoration of its 25th anniversary.

Episodes 

During its 11-season run on the Fox network, Married... with Children aired 258 episodes. A 259th episode, "I'll See You in Court" from season 3, never aired on Fox, but premiered on FX and has since been included on DVD and in syndication packages. Three specials also aired following the series' cancellation, including a cast reunion.

Home media 
Sony Pictures Home Entertainment has released all 11 seasons of Married... with Children on DVD in Regions 1, 2, & 4. On December 12, 2010, Sony released a complete series set on DVD in Region 1.

In December 2007, the Big Bundy Box—a special collection box with all seasons plus new interviews with Sagal and David Faustino—was released. This boxset was released in Australia (Region 4) on November 23, 2009.

The Sony DVD box sets from season 3 onward do not feature the original "Love and Marriage" theme song in the opening sequence. This was done because Sony was unable to obtain the licensing rights to the song for later sets. Despite this, the end credits on the DVDs for season 3 still include a credit for "Love and Marriage."

On August 27, 2013, it was announced that Mill Creek Entertainment had acquired the home media rights to various television series from the Sony Pictures library including Married... with Children with the original theme song "Love and Marriage" sung by Frank Sinatra. They have subsequently re-released the 11 seasons on DVD. The Mill Creek Entertainment version (along with the versions available for streaming and downloading) include scenes that are normally edited in syndication and most of the licensed music that's dubbed over or deleted due to copyright issues. A complete series DVD set was re-released on July 7, 2015, in Region 1. All seasons of Married... with Children are now available for online download and streaming through Amazon, Apple iTunes, Peacock, Hulu, and Vudu.

Merchandise

Books 
 Pig Out With Peg: Secrets from the Bundy Family Kitchen, Avon Books, November 1990, 
 Bundyisms: The Wit and Wisdom of America's Last Family, Boulevard Books, May 1997, 
 The Complete "Married... with Children" Book: TV's Dysfunctional Family Phenomenon, Bear Manor Media, August 2017,

Comic books 
Married... with Children was adapted into a comic book series by NOW Comics in 1990.

Toys

Board game 
Married With Children: Act Like...Think Like...Be Like a...Bundy was released in 1990 by Galoob.

Action figures 
Two series (10 in all) of 8" action figures were produced by Classic TV Toys in 2005 and 2006.
In 2018, Funko produced figures of Al, Kelly, Bud and Peggy as a part of their Funko POP! line.
That same year, Funko also released a Married... with Children box set as a Comic Con Exclusive. It included retro-styled Al, Peggy, Kelly and Bud action figures. In 2018 and 2019, Mego released Target exclusives of Al, Peggy and Kelly in 1/9 scale.

International remakes 
Armenia
An Armenian remake was made in 2016, called The Azizyans. The Azizyans is an Armenian sitcom television series developed by Robert Martirosyan and Van Grigoryan. The series premiered on Armenia TV on October 31, 2016. However, the series was not available to the public until Armenia TV started airing the sitcom from October 10, 2017. The series takes place in Yerevan, Armenia. The Azizyans sitcom is starred by Hayk Marutyan. He embodies the character of Garnik Azizyan – a clothes store seller, who is the only one working in the family. Mrs. Ruzan Azizyan is lazy enough to perform the duties of a housewife.

The problems of the father of the family don't bother his 3 children – his daughter, who is internet-addicted and is active in all social networks; his unemployed eldest son, who is a complete loser, and his youngest son, who is a schoolboy. The roles in this sitcom, created for family watching, are played by Ani Lupe, Satenik Hazaryan, Ishkhan Gharibyan, Suren Arustamyan and other popular Armenian actors. The project is directed by Arman Marutyan. In the second season of the sitcom, the Azizyan family continues to survive thanks to the meager salary of Garnik.

The wife of Garnik – Ruzan, remains in the status of a housewife, without even thinking about finding a job. The elder son of Garnik and Ruzan – Azat, continues to look for a new job, a young man appears in the life of Marie, who is trying to win the girl's heart. Their younger son Levon, continues to live his own life and does not understand what he has in common with this family. And their neighbors Irina and Alik continue to be friends with the family, which Azizyans do not quite approve. The only bright spot in the life of the family is their house, which Garnik inherited from his grandfather.

Argentina
An Argentine remake was made by Telefe in 2005, called Casados con Hijos. Two seasons were made (2005 and 2006), totaling 215 episodes and it became a smashing success during the replaying. More than fifteen years after the release, it is still aired on Saturdays at 7:30 pm. The series has been also shown by local channels in Uruguay, Paraguay, and Peru.

The character names are: José "Pepe" Argento (based on Al, played by Guillermo Francella), Mónica "Moni" Argento (based on Peggy, played by Florencia Peña), Paola Argento (based on Kelly, played by Luisana Lopilato), Alfio "Coqui" Argento (based on Bud, played by Darío Lopilato), Dardo and María Elena Fuseneco (based on Jefferson D'Arcy, Steve Rhoades and Marcy; played by Marcelo de Bellis and Érica Rivas).

Brazil
In Brazil Rede Bandeirantes made a remake in 1999 with the name A Guerra dos Pintos (The War of The Pintos). 52 episodes were recorded but only 22 aired before cancelation.

Bulgaria
In Bulgaria a remake is aired from March 26, 2012, with the name Женени с деца в България (Zheneni s detsa v Bulgaria) (Married with children in Bulgaria).

Croatia
In Croatia a remake called Bračne vode was broadcast from September 2008 until November 2009 on Nova TV channel. The characters based on the Bundys were called Zvonimir, Sunčica, Kristina and Boris Bandić while the ones based on Marcy and Steve were called Marica and Ivan Kumarica.

Germany
In Germany, the 1992 remake Hilfe, meine Familie spinnt, broadcast in the prime time, reached double the audience of the original (broadcast in the early fringe time). This, however, was not enough to maintain the series, so it was cancelled after one season with 26 episodes.The remake used the exact translated scripts of the original series (which already substituted localised humour and in-jokes for incomprehensible references to American TV shows not shown in Germany, as well as some totally different jokes) and just renamed places and people according to the new setting. It had a rerun twice on Super RTL in 1996 and 1997.

 was aired from March to December 1993 for 26 episodes.

Hungary
In 2006, Hungarian TV network TV2 purchased the license rights including scripts and hired the original producers from Sony Pictures for a remake of the show placed in a Hungarian environment. It was entitled  (in English: Married with children in Budapest, loan translation: A gruesomely decent family in Budapest). The main story began with the new family called the Bándis inheriting an outskirt house from their American relatives the Bundys. They filmed a whole season of 26 episodes, all of them being remade versions of the plots of the original first seasons. It was the highest budget sitcom ever made in Hungary. First it was aired on Tuesday nights, but was beaten by a new season of ER, then placed to Wednesday nights. The remake lost its viewers, but stayed on the air due to the contract between Sony and TV2. Also the Hungarian critics have strongly condemned the copyright infringement of the original series. They also criticized the lack of quality and the dilettante forcing of the American cliches in Eastern European (Hungarian) environment.

Israel
The complete American series aired in Israel in the 1990s, with reruns of it ever since. There has also been an Israeli remake to the show titled Nesuim Plus (Married Plus) that aired its two seasons from 2012 to 2017.

Russia

The Original Married... With Children ran on TV-6 Russia in the late 1990s and early 2000s (before the closing of the channel) in prime-time basis, broadcasting the episodes from seasons 1–10. The show later aired on DTV and Domashniy TV. However, for unknown reasons, most episodes from season 11 were not shown. A Russian adaptation, titled Happy Together (Schastlivy Vmeste; Happy Together), was broadcast on TNT across the country.

The character names are: Gena Bukin (based on Al, played by Viktor Loginov), Dasha Bukina (based on Peggy, played by Natalya Bochkareva), Sveta Bukina (based on Kelly, played by Darya Sagalova), Roma Bukin (based on Bud, played by Alexander Yakin), Elena and Anatoliy Poleno (based on Marcy and Jefferson D'Arcy, played by Yulia Zaharova and Pavel Savinkov), Evgeniy Stepanov (based on Steve Rhoades, played by Aleksey Sekirin), Sema Bukin (based on Seven, played by Ilya Butkovskiy), and Baron Bukin (based on Buck and Lucky, played by Bayra).

Turkey
A remake was aired in Turkey in 2004 for one season under the name Evli ve Çocuklu (Married and with Children), featuring Ege Aydan and Yıldız Kaplan in the roles of Niyazi (based on Al) and Jale (based on Peg) Tonguç. The producer, Med Yapım, has published 10 episodes on YouTube in 2018.

UK

ITV had been screening the original Married... With Children since 1988. In 1996, the UK production company Central Television and Columbia Pictures Television (Columbia TriStar Central Productions) produced a UK version called Married for Life, which lasted for one series with seven episodes.

Spin-offs 
Top of the Heap was a sitcom starring Matt LeBlanc. The show was about Vinnie Verducci (played by LeBlanc) and his father Charlie (played by Joseph Bologna) always trying get rich quick schemes. The Verduccis were introduced in an earlier episode where Vinnie dated Kelly Bundy, and Charlie was introduced as an old friend of Al Bundy's. The end of the pilot episode shows Al breaking into their apartment and stealing their TV to replace the one he lost betting on Vinnie in a boxing match. However, the show didn't last long and was ultimately cancelled. It had its own spin-off/sequel called Vinnie & Bobby a year later, which was also cancelled.

Also, an attempt was made to make a spin-off out of David Garrison's Steve Rhoades character which took place on Bud's Trumaine University. The spin-off was called Radio Free Trumaine where Garrison played the Dean. Enemies was another spin-off, but played to be a spoof on the TV series Friends. Meanwhile, a proposed series focusing on the NO MA'AM group without Al Bundy was outright rejected by Fox over fears of misogyny.

On September 11, 2014, it was announced that a spin-off was in the works, centered on the character of Bud Bundy.

Animated revival
On May 13, 2022, Deadline reported that an animated revival of the series was currently in the works with the original cast attached to return. It was further revealed that Sony Pictures Television had been working on the animated series for over a year and waited until they had closed deals with the cast before presenting it to networks and streamers. It was felt that an animated revival worked best due to the original cast's busy schedule as well as Applegate being diagnosed with multiple sclerosis in 2021, making an animated revival more feasible due to the cast's schedules and Applegate's physical limitations.

U.S. syndication and international airings 

Distributed by Columbia Pictures Television Distribution, later Sony Pictures Television since 2002, Married... with Children debuted in off-network syndication in the fall of 1991. The series later began airing on cable on FX from September 1998 until 2007. In June 2002, FX became the first television network to air the controversial, previously banned episode "I'll See You in Court", albeit in an edited format. The full version of "I'll See You in Court" can only be seen on the DVD release Married... with Children: The Most Outrageous Episodes Volume 1 and the Mill Creek Entertainment complete series collection. The version found on the Third Season DVD set under Sony is the edited-for-TV version. In 2008, the Spike network reportedly paid US$12 million for broadcast rights to every episode including the unedited version of the infamous episode "I'll See You in Court".

Syndication rights to the series are currently held by Paramount Media Networks. It previously aired on Antenna TV, Ion Television, TBS, WGN America, and Sony's GetTV channel. WGN America gained rights to the show when TBS removed it from their early morning slots in September 2018. Following its acquisition by Nexstar Media Group and rebrand to NewsNation, the network indicated it would start rolling off its non-news programming as those contracts expire to expand news coverage. Meanwhile, eight Paramount channels have carried the show since 2008: Spike (since renamed Paramount Network), TV Land from 2009 to 2011, Comedy Central from 2010 to 2011, Nick at Nite from July 6 to August 17, 2011, VH1 Classic (now MTV Classic), CMT from 2019–present, and Logo TV. In November 2018, the entire 11-season run became available to watch through Hulu.

Married...with Children has also been a ratings success in other countries around the world.

Locations 
The opening footage comprises views of Chicago, opening with a shot of Buckingham Fountain in Grant Park. The aerial downtown shot was taken from the Lake Shore Drive section north of the Loop. The expressway entrance shot was taken from the 1983 movie National Lampoon's Vacation featuring the Griswolds' green family truckster with a northeastward view of the Dan Ryan/Stevenson junction southwest of the Loop. The exterior shot used for the Bundys' house was taken in a subdivision in Deerfield, Illinois. Non-English versions might differ, e.g. the dubbed German version always includes the expressway shot.

See also 
Modern Family, a show where Ed O'Neill also plays a family man.
Star-ving, a web series created by David Faustino, where the original cast was reunited.
Unhappily Ever After, another show created by Ron Leavitt, treating similar themes.

References

External links 

Official website

 
1987 American television series debuts
1997 American television series endings
1980s American sitcoms
1990s American sitcoms
Casual sex in television
Fox Broadcasting Company original programming
English-language television shows
Nudity in television
Obscenity controversies in television
Television controversies in the United States
Television series by Sony Pictures Television
Television series about dysfunctional families
Television series about marriage
Television shows adapted into comics
Television shows set in Chicago
Television shows filmed in Los Angeles
Television series created by Ron Leavitt